Elvanfoot railway station was a station which served Elvanfoot, in the Scottish county of South Lanarkshire. It was served by local trains on what is now known as the West Coast Main Line.

History 
Opened by the Caledonian Railway, it became part of the London Midland and Scottish Railway during the Grouping of 1923.

Between 1901 and 1938, Elvanfoot was the junction for the branch to Wanlockhead.

Current operations 
Trains pass at speed on the electrified West Coast Main Line. Also at this location is a feeder station from the National Grid. Very few remnants of the station are still visible on the site.

References

Notes

Sources 
 
 
 
 
 Elvanfoot railway station on navigable OS map

Disused railway stations in South Lanarkshire
Railway stations in Great Britain opened in 1848
Railway stations in Great Britain closed in 1965
Beeching closures in Scotland
Former Caledonian Railway stations